Dubrava is a village and a municipality ("općina") in Zagreb County, Croatia.

According to the 2001 Croatian census, there are 5,478 inhabitants in the municipality, 94% which are Croats. They live in 27 naselja:

 Bađinec - 173
 Brezje - 121
 Donji Marinkovac - 101
 Donji Vukšinac - 103
 Dubrava - 1,275
 Dubravski Markovac - 169
 Gornji Marinkovac - 157
 Gornji Vukšinac - 146
 Graberec - 226
 Habjanovac - 200
 Koritna - 204
 Kostanj - 102
 Kunđevac - 92
 Ladina - 125
 Mostari - 211
 Nova Kapela - 279
 Novaki - 232
 Paruževac - 157
 Pehardovac - 16
 Podlužan - 185
 Radulec - 132
 Stara Kapela - 242
 Svinjarec - 63
 Zetkan - 209
 Zgališće - 180
 Zvekovac - 217
 Žukovec - 161

References

Populated places in Zagreb County
Municipalities of Croatia